The continent-ocean boundary (COB) or continent-ocean transition is the boundary between continental crust and oceanic crust on a passive margin. The identification of continent-ocean boundaries is important in the definition of plate boundaries at the time of break-up when trying to reconstruct the geometry and position of ancient continents e.g. in the reconstruction of Pangaea.

Techniques used in identification
 Gravity data inversion - Moho depth can be derived by the inversion of satellite gravity data and thereby crustal thickness
 Magnetic stripe data - Most areas of oceanic crust show characteristic stripes due to periodic magnetic reversals during formation at a mid-oceanic ridge. The continental crust is by contrast typically magnetically quiet.
 Wide-angle seismic refraction and reflection data - These data give a precise location for the COB by determining the P-wave velocities along a profile. The two types of crust have distinct P-wave velocities.

Economic importance
As hydrocarbon exploration moves further offshore to look for the remaining potential on passive margins, understanding the location of the COB is critical to predicting possible hydrocarbon occurrence. This is both from the likely location of source and reservoir rocks and the need to model the thermal effects of break-up in basin modelling

References

Structure of the Earth